Skircoat Green is an area to the south of Halifax, West Yorkshire, England. Skircoat is a ward of the Borough of Calderdale whose population at the 2011 Census was 12,712.

In the 13th century, the land was granted to the Earl Warren, and then passed to the Savile family. This was an independent township before being absorbed by the Borough of Halifax in 1892. The name was originally Schircotes and means building on the rocks. The Skircoat Green Area of Halifax is north of Salterhebble and is one of the most expensive areas of Halifax.

Schools 
The main school in the Skircoat Green area is All Saints CofE J&I School. It provides primary education from Reception through to Year 6 and is consistently ranked as one of the best primary schools in Calderdale.

Shops, pubs and takeaways 
Skircoat Green has a relatively wide variety of shops on its 'high street'.  These include the library, two convenience stores, one of which is also the local post office, two bakeries, a deli, a dentist, two public houses, three hairdressers', one clothes shop, an estate agents, a solicitors, a curtain shop, a takeaway, a fish and chip shop, 'Gallery 339' which sells gifts and cards et cetera, a dry cleaners and a tanning salon, a children's hairdressers was opened in 2012.

Spring Hall
Spring Hall, in Mansion Lane, is a large Gothic Revival building which was rebuilt and restyled in 1871 by William Swinden Barber for Tom Holdsworth. As of 2014 it houses Calderdale Register Office.

References

Areas of Halifax, West Yorkshire